Kevin Hingerl (born 2 September 1993) is a German footballer who plays as a centre-back for Regionalliga Bayern club Türkgücü München.

References

External links

1993 births
Living people
German footballers
Association football defenders
Footballers from Munich
SpVgg Unterhaching players
TSV Buchbach players
SV Wacker Burghausen players
Türkgücü München players
3. Liga players
Regionalliga players